Fort Frances Today is a weekly community newspaper, published by Brown Cow Promotions, and distributed to 30 locations around Fort Frances, Ontario. The publication is free to readers.

Weekly newspapers published in Ontario
Fort Frances
Publications with year of establishment missing